Vitaliy Aleksandrovich Rashkevich (born 8 October 1973) is a Belarusian football manager.

Career
Rashkevich started his career with Lida, where he was became captain at the age of 22, spending his entire playing career with the club aside from a one-match loan spell with KPF Slonim.

In 2011, Rashkevich was appointed head coach of Sheriff Tiraspol, the most successful team in Moldova, helping them win the league before stepping down at the end of the season.

Honours
Sheriff Tiraspol (as coach)
Moldovan National Division champion: 2011–12, 2012–13

References

External links
 

1973 births
Living people
Belarusian footballers
Association football defenders
Association football midfielders
FC Lida players
FC Kommunalnik Slonim players
Belarusian football managers
Belarusian expatriate football managers
Expatriate football managers in Moldova
Belarusian expatriate sportspeople in Moldova
Expatriate football managers in Kazakhstan
FC Lida managers
FC Sheriff Tiraspol managers
Moldovan Super Liga managers